Parampara (meaning the succession) is a 1990 Malayalam film, directed by Sibi Malayil, written by S. N. Swamy, and starring Mammootty, Suresh Gopi and Sumalatha. Mammootty plays two roles in the film, portraying both Johnny, the protagonist, and Lawrence, his father. The film was a commercial failure. The film's story was developed by Swamy on the suggestion of Mammootty after watching an English film. The film was loosely remade in Hindi as Phool Aur Kaante (1991) and in Telugu as Varasudu (1993), both of which were commercial successes.

Plot
When his son is kidnapped by a rival gang, Johnny teams up with his estranged father (Johnny's mother was murdered by his father's enemies) to rescue the kidnapped child.

Cast
 Mammootty (in a dual role) as Johnny / Lawrence
 Suresh Gopi as Chandhu
 Sumalatha as Meera
 Malaysia Vasudevan as Kaliyappa Chettiyar
 Kuthiravattam Pappu as Achuthan
 Sathaar as Police Officer
 M. S. Thripunithura as Meera's Father
 Deepak as Joemon, son of Johnny
 Chithra as Mary, wife of Lawrence.
 Alex Mathew

Soundtrack
The soundtrack album was composed by Mohan Sithara and the lyrics were penned by Kaithapram & Sreekumaran Thampi.

References

External links

view the film
 parampara

1990s Malayalam-language films
1990s crime films
Malayalam films remade in other languages
Films scored by Mohan Sithara
Films directed by Sibi Malayil